Urzila Carlson (born 15 February 1976) is a South African-born New Zealand comedian and actress, known for her stand-up performances as well as her appearances on television programs in both New Zealand and Australia. Carlson is a regular panellist on 7 Days. Carlson is a regular panelist on both the Australian and New Zealand version of Have You Been Paying Attention? and was a panelist on The Masked Singer Australia for the show’s second and third seasons. In 2021, she was a contestant on the second season of Taskmaster NZ.

Biography
Carlson was born in 1976 at the Queen Victoria Hospital in Johannesburg. She grew up on the Ingwelala nature reserve, next to Kruger National Park and has a brother and a sister. Her parents separated when she was 6 or 7 years old. Carlson is a lesbian and came out to her mother when she was 24.

She emigrated to New Zealand from South Africa in 2006 after being subjected to a series of thefts including her car being stolen, an armed robbery at work, and a break-in at her home, in which she and her neighbours confronted the intruder with cricket bats. She became a New Zealand citizen in 2012. As of 2019 she lives in Auckland. She married her partner Julie in 2014, and they have a son and a daughter together.

Her 2016 memoir is called Rolling With The Punchlines.

Carlson speaks English and Afrikaans. In 2018, she was named Australasian Ambassador of South African Tourism, representing the country as part of an ongoing campaign to encourage Australians, New Zealanders and South African expats to visit.

She refers to herself as a "lesbytarian," a portmanteau of lesbian and Presbyterian.

Career
Carlson's first job was as a typesetter for a newspaper, which she did for 12 years. By the age of 24 she was production manager for the largest newspaper in Africa, and won awards for graphic design and photo re-touching.

Carlson moved into comedy in 2008, when she was 32. She has appeared on the Australian shows The Project, Studio 10, Spicks and Specks, Orange Is the New Brown, Have You Been Paying Attention?, Hughesy, We Have a Problem, and two seasons of The Masked Singer. She has also appeared on New Zealand shows 7 Days, Have You Been Paying Attention? and Super City. Stand-up routines include The Long Flight To Freedom.

Carlson performed at the Melbourne International Comedy Festival Gala from 2016 to 2018 and received ‘Best Female Comedian’ at the New Zealand Comedy Guild Awards. She was nominated for the Helpmann Award for Best Comedy Performer in 2018.

In 2019, she appeared in Netflix's Comedians of the World.

In October 2019 she was presented with the Rielly Comedy Award from the Variety Artists Club of New Zealand for her contribution to New Zealand entertainment.

In 2021, she was a contestant on the second series of Taskmaster NZ.

In 2022, she was a guest judge on RuPaul's Drag Race Down Under. In 2023, Carlson appeared on Guy Montgomery's Guy Mont-Spelling Bee.

References

External links

1976 births
Living people
South African stand-up comedians
South African women comedians
South African lesbian actresses
New Zealand women comedians
New Zealand lesbian actresses
Helpmann Award winners
People from Johannesburg
Lesbian comedians
South African emigrants to New Zealand
South African people of New Zealand descent
Typesetters
Naturalised citizens of New Zealand